The North Eastern Gas Board (NEGB), later North East Gas (NeGas) was a state-owned utility providing gas for light and heat to industries and homes in modern-day West Yorkshire, the East Riding of Yorkshire and parts of North Yorkshire.

History 
The North East of England came instead under the Northern Gas Board. Modern day South Yorkshire (with the exception of the most northern parts of the Barnsley and Doncaster boroughs was also never under its remit; instead under the East Midlands Gas Board.

It was established on 1 May 1949 under the terms of the Gas Act 1948, and dissolved in 1973 when it became a region of the newly formed British Gas Corporation, British Gas North Eastern, as a result of the Gas Act 1972. The board's headquarters were in Leeds in buildings which later became administrative buildings for British Gas which were demolished in 2016.

The infrastructure of the former North Eastern Gas Board now forms the Southern region of the region of Northern Gas Networks.

Gallery

See also
 Gas board
 Northern Gas Networks

References

Government agencies established in 1949
Government agencies disestablished in 1973
1949 establishments in England
1973 disestablishments in England
Former nationalised industries of the United Kingdom
Oil and gas companies of England
Utilities of England
Defunct companies based in Leeds